Palazzo Pignano is a comune (municipality) in the Province of Cremona in the Italian region Lombardy, located about  southeast of Milan and about  northwest of Cremona. 
 
Palazzo Pignano borders the following municipalities: Agnadello, Bagnolo Cremasco, Monte Cremasco, Pandino, Torlino Vimercati, Trescore Cremasco, Vaiano Cremasco.

The main sights is the medieval pieve (rural church), dating from the 4th century AD but later rebuilt in Romanesque style.  It houses a terracotta cycle by Agostino Fondulis.

People
 Stefano Donati, (1982), journalist

References

External links
 Official website

Cities and towns in Lombardy